Maramkothi (Woodpecker) is a 2014 Indian Malayalam-language drama romance film written and directed by debutant Baby Thomas and produced by Francis Christyboy under the banner of Woodpecker Productions. The film features Sreejith Ravi, Tini Tom and Poojitha Menon in the lead roles. Kochupreman, Indrans, Mamukkoya, Kulappulli Leela and Chali Pala are in the supporting roles.

Plot 
The film is centered around a group of common people who fight hard for land and nature. After the withdrawal of British powers from India, a sizeable portion of land came under the possession of landlords which made the conditions of local folks pity.
When the cruelty of landlords increased, many tenants were forced to leave their land, which included a five-year-old boy along with his family. But unnatural incidents were awaiting when he returned to his own land after a long time. He had to face difficult situations and circumstances which led him to raise his voice against the prevailing social evils.

Cast
 Sreejith Ravi as Maramkothi
 Poojitha Menon as Priyamvadha Thamburatti
 Tini Tom as Sakthan Thamburan
 Kulappulli Leela as Marutha Maria
 Santhakumari
 Soniya Malhaar
 Mamukkoya
 Kochu Preman
 Chali Pala
 Indrans
 Jayan Cherthala
 Ullas Pandalam
 Nelson
 Jeeja Surendran
 Rini Raj as Anima

Music 
The soundtrack for the film was composed by Mathew T Itty, with lyrics written by the director Baby Thomas.

References 
http://www.movierola.com/#!/mollywood/movie/21253/Maramkothi

External links 
 

2014 films
2010s Malayalam-language films